Ave-Dakpa is a town in the Volta Region of Ghana and the capital of the Akatsi North District. The town is known for the Ave-Dakpa Secondary. The school is a second cycle institution. The town has a crocodile pond that attracts tourists from near and far.

References

Populated places in the Volta Region